The 1993 Spanish Grand Prix was a Formula One motor race held on 9 May 1993 at the Circuit de Catalunya. It was the fifth race of the 1993 Formula One World Championship. The 65-lap race was won from pole position by Alain Prost, driving a Williams-Renault, with Ayrton Senna second in a McLaren-Ford and Michael Schumacher third in a Benetton-Ford. This was the only time Prost, Senna and Schumacher shared the podium together. 

The Williams-Renaults filled the front row in qualifying, with Prost ahead of Hill, Senna, Schumacher, Patrese and Wendlinger. At the start, Hill got ahead of Prost with no changes behind. Hill was leading Prost, Senna, Schumacher, Patrese and Wendlinger.

Hill and Prost pulled away from the rest with Prost taking the lead on lap 11. Later in the race Prost's car began to handle oddly and Hill closed up on him, attempting to re-overtake the Frenchman, only to retire when his engine failed on lap 41. Schumacher and Senna both pitted for tyres late in the race. Senna had a tardy stop, and he lost nearly all his advantage over Schumacher, who put in a string of fastest laps to close the gap. This challenge was ended when Schumacher went off the track at the final corner, after having to go off line to pass the smoking Lotus of Alessandro Zanardi. Prost won from Senna, Schumacher, Patrese, Andretti and Berger.

Classification

Qualifying

Race

Championship standings after the race

Drivers' Championship standings

Constructors' Championship standings

References

Spanish Grand Prix
Spanish Grand Prix
Grand Prix
Spanish Grand Prix